Sir Roger Hill (19 June 1642 – 29 December 1729) of Denham Place, Buckinghamshire was an English landowner, courtier and Whig politician who sat in the English and British House of Commons between 1679 and 1722.

Hill was the eldest surviving son of Roger Hill of Poundisford Park, Somerset and his second wife  Abigail Gurdon, daughter of Brampton Gurdon of Assington, Suffolk. He was admitted at Jesus College, Cambridge on 8 June 1658 and admitted at the Inner Temple in 1657, where he was called to the bar in 1666. He was planning to follow his father into the legal profession, but his father  died in 1667, and he  succeeded to the Poundisfoot estate. 

In 1667, he married  Abigail Lockey, the daughter of John Lockey of Holmshill, Hertfordshire, He was knighted in July 1668. He was appointed a Gentleman of the privy chamber in 1668, a position he held until 1685. In 1670, he bought the manor of Denham from the Bowyers and rebuilt the house there between 1688 and 1701. He  sold Poundisfoot to Simon Welman, a retired physician. He was selected High Sheriff of Buckinghamshire for the year 1672 to 1673.

Hill was elected to Parliament as the member for Amersham from  1679 to 1681. He was returned as MP for Wendover at the  1702 English general election, but was unseated on petition. He was returned again at the 1705 English general election  and sat until 1722.

Hill died on 29 December 1729, aged 87, and was buried at Denham church. He left two sons and two daughters. Denham Place passed to his eldest son, Roger, who died shortly after his father.

References

External links
 Geoffrey Veysey A Justice's Diary  Extract from Hill's diary from 18  May  1689 to 11  October  1705

|-

|-

1642 births
1729 deaths
Politicians from Somerset
People from Buckinghamshire
Alumni of Jesus College, Cambridge
Members of the Inner Temple
Gentlemen of the Privy Chamber
Knights Bachelor
High Sheriffs of Buckinghamshire
English MPs 1679
English MPs 1680–1681
English MPs 1702–1705
English MPs 1705–1707
British MPs 1707–1708
British MPs 1708–1710
British MPs 1710–1713
British MPs 1713–1715
British MPs 1715–1722